Roger Dutoit (8 February 1923 – 3 May 1988) was a French film actor. He appeared in more than thirty films from 1955 to 1982.

Filmography

References

External links
 

1923 births
1988 deaths
People from Calais
French male film actors
French male television actors
French male stage actors
20th-century French male actors